Bellarine Secondary College is a multi-campus school on the Bellarine Peninsula, Australia. The college consists of 2 campuses, one in Ocean Grove, and the main campus in Drysdale. The larger and main campus in Drysdale holds the students in years 9, 10, 11 and 12, while the smaller Ocean Grove campus holds the students in Years 7 and 8. The Drysdale campus holds around 1000 approx. students, and the Ocean Grove campus accommodates around 400 students.  It has a SEAL (Select Entry Accelerated Learning) class, which means the students are able to do years 7–10 in 3, not 4 years. This also means that students have 3 years to do VCE, not 2.

Bellarine Secondary College has been labelled as the Number 1 School in the Greater Geelong Area

History
Bellarine Secondary College is an amalgamation of Queenscliff High School, which was founded in 1945 as a Higher Elementary School and then upgraded to a High School in 1957, and Ocean Grove High School. The Queenscliff campus has since been demolished, but the Ocean Grove campus is a reminder of one of these two schools.
At the Drysdale campus especially, the names of the houses and building wings are taken from Queenscliff High School, just as the board of Bellarine S.C principles is the same as the board for Queenscliff H.S Headmasters.

Extracurricular activities

RoboCup

Bellarine Secondary has a multitude of past and present national standard RoboCup teams. The College has had multiple entries into the Australian Championships across the years.

2008 
In 2008 a team went through to win the soccer grand finals.

2009 
In 2009 two teams made it to the Australian National Championships in Sydney, and both teams made it to the soccer grand finals. Team Trigger Happy Bunnies took 1st place.

2010 
In 2010, a team went to Singapore to compete in the World Cup.
Later in 2010, Bellarine entered a number of teams into the Victorian State Finals, with success in all of the levels, plus the recognition of winning the first Lego League Robocup event in the world. A similar format was used for the World Robot Olympiad (WRO) in Manila in 2010, with the Bellarine team at the event being knocked out in the quarter-finals 10–8.

2011 
In 2011, the college sent three students to the University of Tasmania for the 2011 RoboCupJunior National competition, respectively, they came 1st and 2nd in the GENII Soccer league. From this great win for the school they were eligible to go to the WRO the next year.

2012 

In 2012, Bellarine sent 6 students to the World Robot Olympiad in Kuala Lumpur, Malaysia. Their teams The Wombots and Blue Tongues finished 16th and 23rd out of the 60 countries to participate.

2013 
As of 2013, Bellarine has four RoboCup teams participating in the following leagues – Lightweight and Open.

Lightweight teams – Xenon Robotics & Vector Robotics

Open teams – 2KF Industries & BiffTech.

Regionals 

On 26 July, all teams competed in their respective leagues at Christian College (Drysdale Campus). The results were:

They qualified to go to the Melbourne States Competition held on 23 August at Scienceworks Museum (Melbourne) in Spotswood, Victoria.

State 

The teams respectively went to the Melbourne State competition, and did quite well at the event.

National championships 

Vector, Xenon and BiffTech all went to the National Open Championships held at the UQ Centre, University of Queensland, St Lucia, QLD.
Xenon won 6 games and in the Semi-finals they played against Vector Robotics being 4–4, but lost to Vector, when they scored 5 seconds before the end of the game, leaving the game 5–4.

Xenon then went on to secure 3rd place in the Lightweight league. Vector Robotics lost to SRXFC by 11 goals. 
BiffTech finally won against TCR after 2 years and came 1st in the Open (Premier) league.

Rock Eisteddfod

Bellarine Secondary has competed in many Rock Eisteddfod Challenges.

References

https://web.archive.org/web/20110822154841/http://www.bellarinesc.vic.edu.au/index.html
Public high schools in Victoria (Australia)
Educational institutions established in 1957
Bellarine Peninsula
1957 establishments in Australia